Joshua Poteat  is an American poet

Background
Joshua Poteat got his Bachelor of Arts in English from the University of North Carolina Wilmington in 1993. received his Master of Fine Arts in writing at Virginia Commonwealth University in May 1997.

Poteat has published two books of poems, Ornithologies (Anhinga Poetry Prize, 2006) and Illustrating the Machine that Makes the World (University of Georgia Press/Virginia Quarterly Review, 2009), as well as a chapbook, Meditations (Poetry Society of America National Chapbook Award, 2004). He has won prizes and fellowships from bodies including The Literary Review, Bellingham Review, The Millay Colony, Virginia Commission for the Arts and Virginia Center for Creative Arts. He was named the 2011-2012 Donaldson Writer in Residence at The College of William & Mary.

Poteat is also an assemblage artist of sorts, making light boxes and ink transfers out of found materials, and collaborating with the designer Roberto Ventura on art installations, one of which won Best in Show for InLight 2009.

Poteat lives in Richmond, VA, with the writer Allison Titus. He is an editor at the Martin Agency.

Reviews
Melanie Drane, at ForeWord Magazine, stated in May 2006: "Joshua Poteat's stunning début has received the Anhinga Prize for Poetry, selected by Campbell McGrath. Poteat's poems are suffused with the cognizance that 'nothing in this world is ours.' Each image teeters on an unsustainable, exquisite edge."

Mary Oliver, a judge for the 2004 Poetry Society of America's Chapbook Award, stated that: "It is a lyricism that reminds me of James Wright, and this I mean certainly as praise, when he employed, as I called it, an intensified vernacular—throwing me off my stride, gathering me to him by the detail of some earnest and often terrible beauty, in the easy language of our country with its sweet, oiled syntax…" 

Darren Morris a book reviewer for Style Weekly said in 2006 that: "Be careful when reading Ornithologies by Joshua Poteat. His poems are so mysterious, eloquent and downright powerful, they may ruin you with beauty. Good poetry calls attention to what would otherwise be overlooked, but the best poetry changes us."

Publications
 Meditations (2004) 
 Ornithologies  (2006)
 Illustrating the machine that makes the world: From J.G. Heck's 1851 Pictorial Archive of Nature and Science, University of Georgia Press, Virginia Quarterly Review Contemporary Poets Series, (2009)

References

External links
Official site
Blackbird poetry

Year of birth missing (living people)
Living people
Writers from Richmond, Virginia
American male poets
University of North Carolina at Wilmington alumni